AppAssure was a backup and recovery software company founded in 2006 and based in Reston, Virginia.

It was purchased by Dell in 2012. It has since been subsumed by Quest Rapid Recovery.

Company history 
AppAssure was founded by Najaf Husain in 2006. In 2008, AppAssure Software received a "Series A" investment by Bain Capital Ventures.

On Friday, Feb. 24, 2012, Dell announced the acquisition of AppAssure, renaming it to Dell AppAssure, which became a part of the Dell Software Group portfolio. Later, upon a new major version release, the company renamed the AppAssure product to Rapid Recovery.

On November 1, 2016, Francisco Partners and Elliot Management acquired Dell Software Group, which was re-launched as Quest Software. Rapid Recovery is currently part of the Quest Software portfolio.

Features 
Rapid Recovery software optimizes users’ application experience and simplifies backup and recovery. Rapid Recovery protects systems, apps and data, whether it's physical, virtual or in the cloud. It connects to the cloud and protects growing virtual environments automatically. In 2016, Rapid Recovery added the ability to implement DraaS in the Azure cloud.

The technology is available as software or in rack-mountable appliances (DL Series Appliances).

References

External links 
 AppAssure

Defunct software companies of the United States
Software companies established in 2006
Quest Software
2012 mergers and acquisitions
2006 establishments in Virginia
Software companies disestablished in 2012
2012 disestablishments in Virginia